The French Crystallographic Association (AFC) brings together physicists, chemists and biologists that use crystals and crystallography in their research or develop new crystallographic methods. Originally part of the French Society of Mineralogy, the AFC was founded in 1953 by Hubert Curien and André Guinier. Today, its main goals are to promote dissemination of knowledge and exchange between French speaking crystallographers from all fields, and in particular to organize or support specialized or interdisciplinary workshops and conferences, educational actions and training courses in the area of crystallography. During the biannual AFC conferences, the AFC awards three PhD prizes in each of its research areas: Physics, Chemistry and Biology.

Claude Sauter, scientist at the Institut de Biologie Moléculaire et Cellulaire in Strasbourg is the President of the AFC from January 1st, 2022.

Former presidents
 Claude Sauter (2022-2025)
 Philippe Guionneau (2017-2021)
 René Guinebretière (2013-2016)
 Jacqueline Cherfils (2011-2013)
 Jean-Claude Daran (2008-2010)
 Jean-Louis Hodeau (2003-2007)
 Claude Lecomte (1997-2002)
 Roger Fourme (1994-1997)
 Massimo Marezio (1990-1993)
 Michel Hospital (1987-1990)
 Jean-François Petroff (1984-1987)
 Jean Meinnel (1981-1983)
 Stanislas Goldstaub
 Jean Wyart
 Robert Gay
 André Guinier (president of the International Union of Crystallography from 1969 to 1972)

AFC conferences 
 IUCr-3 ----- Paris (1954)
 AFC62 ----- Bordeaux
 ECM-1 ----- Bordeaux (1973)
 AFC83 ----- Lille
 AFC88 ----- Lyon
 IUCr-15 ----- Bordeaux (1990)
 AFC92 ----- Paris
 AFC93 ----- Strasbourg
 AFC95 ----- Grenoble
 AFC98 ----- Orléans
 ECM-19 ---- Nancy (2000)
 AFC2001 --- Orsay
 AFC2003 --- Caen
 AFC2006 --- Toulouse
 AFC2008 --- Rennes
 AFC2010 --- Strasbourg
 AFC2013 --- Bordeaux
 AFC2016 --- Marseille
 AFC2018 --- Lyon
 AFC2021 --- Grenoble (remotely)

See also 
International Union of Crystallography

External links 

 Website of the French Crystallographic Association

Crystallography organizations
Scientific organizations established in 1953
Scientific organizations based in France
1953 establishments in France
Geology societies